Grega Žemlja was the defending champion, but chose to compete in the 2013 Birmingham Championship instead.
Steve Johnson won the final 7–5, 7–5 against Ruben Bemelmans.

Seeds

Draw

Finals

Top half

Bottom half

References
 Main Draw
 Qualifying Draw

Nottingham Challengeandnbsp;- Singles
2013 Men's Singles